This is an accurate list of zoos in Australia. For aquariums, see List of aquaria in Australia.

Zoos are primarily facilities where animals are displayed to the public, and in which they may also be bred. Such facilities include zoos, safari parks, animal theme parks, aviaries, butterfly zoos, and reptile centres, as well as wildlife sanctuaries and nature reserves where visitors are allowed.

Australian Capital Territory
Canberra Reptile Zoo, Nicholls
 Canberra Walk in Aviary , Nicholls
National Zoo & Aquarium, Yarralumla

New South Wales
Altina Wildlife Park, Darlington Point
Auburn Botanic Gardens, Auburn
Australian Walkabout Wildlife Park, Calga, Central Coast
Australian Reptile Park, Somersby
Banana Cabana Primate Sanctuary, Dural
Billabong Koala and Wildlife Park, Port Macquarie
Birdland Animal Park, Batemans Bay
Blackbutt Reserve, Kotara
Byron Bay Wildlife Sanctuary, Tintenbar (formerly Macadamia castle)
Central Coast Zoo, Wyong Creek
Central Gardens, Merrylands
Calmsley City Farm, Abbotsbury (formerly Fairfield City Farm)
Featherdale Wildlife Park, Doonside
Hunter Valley Wildlife Park, Nulkaba (formerly Hunter Valley Zoo)
Koala Park Sanctuary, West Pennant Hills
Mogo Wildlife Park, Mogo (formerly Mogo Zoo)
Oakvale Wildlife Park, Salt Ash
Potoroo Palace Native Animal Educational Sanctuary, Merimbula (formerly Yellow Pinch Wildlife Park)
Shoalhaven Zoo, Nowra
Sydney Zoo, Bungarribee
Symbio Wildlife Park, Helensburgh
Taralga Wildlife Park, Taralga
Taronga Western Plains Zoo, Dubbo
Taronga Zoo, Mosman
Wagga Wagga Zoo, Wagga Wagga
Wild Cat Conservation Centre, Wilberforce
Wild Life Sydney, Darling Harbour
Zambi Wildlife RetreatWallacia

Northern Territory
Alice Springs Desert Park, Alice Springs
Alice Springs Reptile Centre,Alice Springs
Crocodylus Park, Darwin
Crocosaurus Cove, Darwin
Territory Wildlife Park, Berry Springs

Queensland
 Alexandra Park Zoo, Bundaberg
 Australia Zoo, Sunshine Coast
 Billabong Sanctuary, Nome, Townsville
 Birdworld Kuranda, Kuranda
 Brisbane Forest Park, Brisbane
 Bungalow Bay Koala Village, Magnetic Island
 Cairns Zoom & Wildlife Dome, Cairns
 Cooberrie Park, Woodbury
 Currumbin Wildlife Sanctuary, Gold Coast
 Darling Downs Zoo, Pilton
 David Fleay Wildlife Park, Gold Coast
 Flying High Bird Park], Apple Tree Creek
 Hartley's Crocodile Adventures, Palm Cove
 Ipswich Nature Centre, Ipswich
 Kumbartcho Sanctuary, Eatons Hill, Brisbane
 Kuranda Koala Gardens, Kuranda
 Lone Pine Koala Sanctuary, Brisbane
 Paradise Country, Oxenford
 Rainforestation Nature Park, Kuranda
 Rockhampton Zoo, Rockhampton
 Snakes Down Under Reptile Park and Zoo, Childers
 Wild Life Hamilton Island, Hamilton Island
 Wildlife HQ Zoo, Big Pineapple Woombye, Sunshine Coast
 Wildlife Habitat, Port Douglas

South Australia
Adelaide Zoo, Adelaide 
Cleland Wildlife Park, Cleland
Glen-Forest Tourist Park,Port Lincoln
Gorge Wildlife Park, Cudlee Creek
Monarto Safari Park, Monarto
Kangaroo Island Wildlife Park, Seddon, Kangaroo Island
Urimbirra Wildlife Park, Victor Harbor
Warrawong Sanctuary, Mylor

Tasmania
Bonorong Wildlife Sanctuary, Brighton
Devils@Cradle, Cradle Mountain
East Coast Natureworld, Bicheno
Serpentarium Wildlife Park, St Helens
Tasmania Zoo, Launceston
Tasmanian Devil Unzoo, Taranna
Trowunna Wildlife Park, Mole Creek
Wing's Wildlife Park, Gunns Plains
Zoodoo Wildlife Park, Richmond

Victoria
Ballarat Wildlife Park, Ballarat
Gumbuya World, Tynong North
Halls Gap Zoo, Halls Gap
Healesville Sanctuary, Healesville
Kyabram Fauna Park, Kyabram
Mansfield Zoo, Mansfield
Maru Koala and Animal Park, Grantville
Melbourne Zoo, Melbourne
Moonlit Sanctuary Wildlife Conservation Park, Pearcedale
Phillip Island Wildlife Park, Cowes
Werribee Open Range Zoo, Werribee

Western Australia
Armadale Reptile Centre, Armadale
Australian Wildlife Park Albany, Torndirrup
Bunbury Wildlife Park, Bunbury
Broome Crocodile Park, Broome
Caversham Wildlife Park, Whiteman, Perth
Cohunu Koala Park, Perth
Country Life Farm, Dunsborough
Denmark Animal Farm, Denmark
Discover Deadly, Carbunup River, Western Australia
Esperance Bird & Animal Park, Gibson
Greenough Wildlife & Bird Park, Greenough
Kanyana Wildlife Rehabilitation Centre, Lesmurdie
Perth Zoo, Perth
Ranger Red’s Zoo & Conservation Park, Mandurah
Wave Rock Wildlife Park, Hyden
West Australian Reptile Park, Henley Brook

See also 
 List of zoos
 List of aquaria in Australia
 List of botanical gardens in Australia
 List of beaches in Australia

Notes

External links
Australian Zoos on zooinstitutes.com

Zoos
 
Australia
Zoos